Petar Lončarević (20 November 1907 – 30 March 1978) was a Serbian footballer who played two matches for the Kingdom of Yugoslavia national team.

While attending a Yugoslav First League match between Olimpija Ljubljana and Hajduk Split in the spring of 1978, he got into an argument with fans of the Ljubljana team and one of them struck him in the head with a blunt object. He lost consciousness and was hospitalized where he was placed in a coma. After not regaining consciousness, he died seventeen days later at the age of 70.

References

1907 births
1978 deaths
Footballers from Belgrade
Serbian footballers
Yugoslav footballers
Association football defenders
Yugoslav First League players
SK Jugoslavija players
SK Jedinstvo Beograd players
People murdered in Slovenia
Accidental deaths in Slovenia
Yugoslavia international footballers